State Route 790 (SR 790) is an east–west state highway in southeastern Ohio, a U.S. state. Traversing the Wayne National Forest for its duration, SR 790's western terminus is at SR 775 in the unincorporated community of Lecta.

Route description
No portion of SR 790 is included within the National Highway System, a system of highways that are deemed most important for the country's economy, defense and mobility.

History
SR 790 came into existence in 1937.  When first designated, it was an L-shaped route that began at SR 217 in Scottown, followed today's Lawrence County Road 37 northerly up to Lecta, ran concurrent with SR 775 northerly for one block, then turned east to follow its current alignment to SR 218 near Mercerville.  By 1955, the official state transportation map indicated that jurisdiction of the stretch of SR 790 from Scottown to Lecta had been transferred to Lawrence County, and the highway took on the look that it does today.  No other major changes have taken place to the routing of SR 790 since that time.

Major intersections

References

790
Transportation in Lawrence County, Ohio
Transportation in Gallia County, Ohio